The Born Lakes are a chain of eleven alpine and glacial Paternoster lakes in Custer County, Idaho, United States, located in the White Cloud Mountains in the Sawtooth National Recreation Area.  The lakes are located on the upper portion of the Warm Springs Creek watershed, a tributary of the Salmon River.  The Born Lakes surrounded by Patterson, Blackmon, and Lonesome Lake Peaks.  Sawtooth National Forest trail 671 leads to the lakes.  The individual lakes do have official names, and many of them have partially or nearly completely filled in with sediment.

Proper name
The Born Lakes have been known by various names including: Boone Lakes, Born lakes, and Boorn Lakes.  In 1964, the United States Board on Geographical Names proposed that the name "Born Lakes" should be established as the official name.  However, in 2009, James Ridenour of Spokane Valley, Washington, submitted a proposal to correct the spelling of "Born Lakes" to "Boorn Lakes", to restore the spelling that appeared on early Federal maps and to properly recognize the intended honoree — Samuel S. Boorn (ca.1840-ca.1900), who staked the first mining claim in Custer County. The name "Boorn Lakes" became official in August 2009.  Despite this official name change, the name "Born Lakes" continues to appear on most maps of the region.

See also

List of lakes of the White Cloud Mountains
Chamberlain Basin
D. O. Lee Peak
Sawtooth National Forest
Sawtooth National Recreation Area
White Cloud Mountains

References

Lakes of Idaho
Lakes of Custer County, Idaho
Glacial lakes of the United States
Glacial lakes of the Sawtooth National Forest